OTO Award TV Program

Currently held by  Tvoja tvár znie povedome – Markíza

First awarded  | Last awarded 2000 | Present 

OTO Award for TV Program has been bestowed to the most recognized television program of the past year in Slovakia since 2000. The category includes various formats, such as a reality television, TV special, or else.

Winners and nominees

2000s

2010s

Superlatives

References

External links
 OTO Awards (Official website)
 OTO Awards - Winners and nominees (From 2000 onwards)
 OTO Awards - Winners and nominees (From 2000 to 2009)

OTO Awards
Slovak culture
Slovak television awards
Awards established in 2000